Robert Bogucki (born 1966) is an American firefighter from Alaska notable for having survived 43 days lost in Western Australia's Great Sandy Desert before being rescued.

Lost 
It is on the Great Northern Highway between Port Hedland and Broome,  from the coast. Bogucki left the roadhouse on 11 July 1999. He intended to ride his bike across the Great Sandy Desert to Fitzroy Crossing. Whilst police called off the initial search for Bogucki after 12 days, family members hired specialist trackers to continue the search and soon found fresh evidence that Bogucki had survived at least that long.

Found 
Bogucki's subsequent treatment by the Channel Nine crew raised questions as to the extent to which they had ignored his well-being in order to secure an exclusive news story. With there only being four seats in the helicopter, West Australian photographer Robert Duncan was left behind with a bottle of water and an EPIRB. After going without food for about six weeks and water for twelve days, Bogucki had lost  during the ordeal. He found water by digging and straining mud, but also drank from stagnant pools. Later he took to eating flowers and plants. Medical staff at Broome Hospital said his physical condition was "remarkable".

Dramatisation & awards 
Bogucki's story and the search for him were made into an episode of the three-part ABC series Miracles, entitled "Miracle in the Desert".

Robert Duncan, West Australian photographer, won the 1999 Daily News Centenary Prize WA Media Awards (informally known as the Gold Award, or the WA Journalist of the Year) for his involvement, photos and coverage of the search.

References

External links 
 YouTube documentary movie about Robert Bogucki

1966 births
American firefighters
American explorers
Living people
People from Fairbanks, Alaska
Great Sandy Desert